Streptophlebia is a genus of moths in the family Erebidae erected by George Hampson in 1898.

Species
Streptophlebia albipuncta (Hampson, 1898)
Streptophlebia antipolo (Semper, 1898)
Streptophlebia bicellulata (Kaye, 1918)
Streptophlebia obliquistria Hampson, 1898

References

External links

Syntomini
Moth genera